Padma Subrahmanyam (born 4 February 1943, in Madras), is an Indian classical Bharata Natyam dancer. She is also a research scholar, choreographer,  teacher, Indologist and author. She is famous in India as well as abroad; several films and documentaries have been made in her honor by countries such as Japan, Australia and Russia. She is well known as the developer and founder of the dance form Bharata Nrithyam.

Biography
Padma Subrahmanyam was born to Krishnaswami Subrahmanyam, the Indian film director and Meenakshi Subrahmanyam on 4 February 1943 in Madras (now Chennai). Her father was a famous Indian filmmaker and her mother, Meenakshi was a music composer and a lyricist in Tamil and Sanskrit. She was trained by Vazhuvoor B. Ramaiyah Pillai. She started teaching dance at a very young age of 14 at her father's dance school. She felt that there was a gap between history, theory and dance and started doing her own research. She had her rangapravesha in 1956.

She has taught in Monfort Rukmani Devi, Maharaja Aagarsen and various other schools in the years 2009 to 2011 and imparted knowledge to the children. Padma holds a bachelor's degree in music, a master's degree in Ethnomusicology, as well as a PhD in Dance under the guidance of Kuthur Ramakrishnan Srinivasan, noted archaeologist and a Padma Bhushan recipient. Her PhD was based on the reconstruction of the 108 Karanas, which are dance movements described in the Natyasastra. She has authored many articles, research papers and books and has served as a non-official member of the Indo-Sub-commission for education and culture. She has designed the sculptures of the 108 sculptures of Lord Nataraja and goddess Parvathi in black granite for the Nataraja temple at Satara, an undertaking she took on bidding by the Kanchi Paramacharya. She has given lectures at various universities in southeast Asia, on the subject of cultural links between India and other countries.

Awards
Padma has received Padma Shri in 1981 and Padma Bhushan in 2003, which are among the highest civilian awards of India. During her dancing career, she has received more than 100 awards, including;
 Sangeet Natak Akademi Award (1983)
 Padma Bhushan (2003)
 Padma Shri (1981)
 Kalaimamani Award from the government of Tamil Nadu
 Kalidas Samman from the federal government of Madhya Pradesh,
 Nishagandhi Puraskaram by the Government of Kerala in 2015,
 Nada Brahmam from Narada Gana Sabha in Chennai,
 Bharata Sastra Rakshamani from the Jagadguru Shankaracharya of Kanchipuram .
 Nehru Award (1983) from the Soviet Union
 Fukuoka Asian Culture Prize from Japan, for "her contribution to development and harmony in Asia"

References

External links

India's 50 Most Illustrious Women by Indra Gupta

1943 births
Living people
Performers of Indian classical dance
Indian dance teachers
Indian classical choreographers
Bharatanatyam exponents
Artists from Chennai
Recipients of the Kalaimamani Award
Recipients of the Sangeet Natak Akademi Award
Recipients of the Padma Shri in arts
Recipients of the Padma Bhushan in arts
Ethnomusicologists
Indian female classical dancers
Indian women choreographers
Indian choreographers
Dancers from Tamil Nadu
20th-century Indian dancers
Women educators from Tamil Nadu
Teachers of Indian classical dance
20th-century Indian educators
20th-century Indian women artists
Women artists from Tamil Nadu
Educators from Tamil Nadu
Stella Maris College, Chennai alumni
Indian women anthropologists
20th-century women educators
Recipients of the Sangeet Natak Akademi Fellowship